Saipa Quik is a small family car built by the Iranian car manufacturer Saipa from 2017. It is the hatchback version of "Saina", a sedan also made by Saipa.

Overview
In English, "quick" means fast and agile. Also, Quik is a name of a tribe of Kurds in Iranian Kurdistan and there are some villages with this name in that region.

Powertrain
The car has an automatic CVT transmission, with a Euro 4 fuel system upgradeable to Euro 5. The engine is a 1.5 L I4 and its maximum power is 87 HP.

Saipa Atlas
The Saipa Atlas is an improved version of the Quik, being launched in December 2022.

References

Cars of Iran
Saipa vehicles
Crossover sport utility vehicles
Cars introduced in 2017